"A Man Ain't Made of Stone" is a song written by Gary Burr, Robin Lerner, and Franne Golde, and recorded by American country music artist Randy Travis.  It was released in August 1999 as the lead single and title track from his album A Man Ain't Made of Stone.  It reached number 16 on the Hot Country Singles & Tracks (now Hot Country Songs) chart and number 24 on the Canadian RPM Country Tracks. It also peaked at number 82 on the U.S. Billboard Hot 100, making it a minor crossover hit.

Music video
The music video was directed by David Cass and premiered in late 1999. It was filmed in Santa Fe, New Mexico.

Chart performance
"A Man Ain't Made of Stone" debuted at number 68 on the U.S. Billboard Hot Country Singles & Tracks for the week of August 14, 1999.

References

1999 singles
Randy Travis songs
Songs written by Gary Burr
Songs written by Franne Golde
Song recordings produced by Byron Gallimore
Song recordings produced by James Stroud
Song recordings produced by Randy Travis
DreamWorks Records singles
Songs written by Robin Lerner
1999 songs